Luonan County (alternatively ) is a county under the administration of Shangluo city, in the east of Shaanxi province, China, bordering Henan province to the east. Luonan is at the source of the Luo River. It is 108 kilometers away from Xi'an, the capital of Shaanxi province. Luonan has 14 towns. Its walnut production ranks first in China. Its gold production ranks third in Shaanxi. More than 66.7% of Luonan is covered in forests.

Administrative divisions
Luonan County has 1 subdistrict and 9 towns.
1 subdistrict
 Chengguan

9 towns
 Maping
 Shimen
 Shipo
 Xunjian
 Si′er
 Lingkou
 Sanyao
 Gucheng
 Jingcun

Climate

References

County-level divisions of Shaanxi
Shangluo